The 1956 Northern Illinois State Huskies football team represented Northern Illinois State College—now known as Northern Illinois University—as a member of the Interstate Intercollegiate Athletic Conference (IIAC) during the 1956 NCAA College Division football season. Led by first-year head coach Howard Fletcher, the Huskies compiled an overall record of 1–8 with a mark of 0–6 in conference play, placing last out of seven teams in the IIAC. The team played home games at the 5,500-seat Glidden Field, located on the east end of campus, in DeKalb, Illinois.

Schedule

References

Northern Illinois State
Northern Illinois Huskies football seasons
Northern Illinois State Huskies football